Joseph "Jobi" Wall (born September 12, 1989) is an American professional basketball player who last played for the Lakeside Lightning of the State Basketball League (SBL).

College career
Wall first attended Colorado Christian before an injury forced him to miss the majority of the 2010–11 season. At the end of the season, he transferred to Seattle Pacific.

Professional career
Wall started his professional career in Portugal with CAB Madeira, where he spent the 2013–14 season. He went on to spend three seasons in the Czech Republic with Pardubice between 2014 and 2017, where he won the Czech Cup in 2016. He moved to Poland for the 2017–18 season, where he played for Legia Warsaw.

On July 6, 2018, Wall signed with Donar of the Dutch Basketball League. In January 2019, the club terminated his contract. He subsequently moved to Australia to the play for the Lakeside Lightning of the State Basketball League.

References

External links
Seattle Pacific Falcons bio
Colorado Christian Cougars bio

1989 births
Living people
American expatriate basketball people in Australia
American expatriate basketball people in Poland
American expatriate basketball people in Portugal
American expatriate basketball people in the Czech Republic
American expatriate basketball people in the Netherlands
American men's basketball players
Basketball players from Colorado
BK Pardubice players
CAB Madeira players
Colorado Christian Cougars men's basketball players
Donar (basketball club) players
Dutch Basketball League players
Legia Warsaw (basketball) players
Power forwards (basketball)
Seattle Pacific Falcons men's basketball players